Pirmin Blaak (born 8 March 1988) is a Dutch field hockey player who plays as a goalkeeper for Oranje-Rood and the Dutch national team.

Club career
Blaak started playing hockey at HC Barendrecht. In 2000 he switched to Rotterdam, with whom he won their first national title in 2013. He played there for 16 years until 2016 when he switched to Oranje-Rood.

International career
Blaak made his debut for the national team in 2011. He was the second goalkeeper behind Jaap Stockmann until 2016 when he became the joint first goalkeeper with Sam van der Ven. For the 2018 World Cup he was chosen as the first goalkeeper for the tournament. In June 2019, he was selected as the joint first goalkeeper in the Netherlands squad for the 2019 EuroHockey Championship. They won the bronze medal by defeating Germany 4–0.

References

External links

1988 births
Living people
Sportspeople from Rotterdam
Dutch male field hockey players
Male field hockey goalkeepers
2014 Men's Hockey World Cup players
2018 Men's Hockey World Cup players
Field hockey players at the 2020 Summer Olympics
Olympic field hockey players of the Netherlands
HC Rotterdam players
HC Oranje-Rood players
Men's Hoofdklasse Hockey players
2023 Men's FIH Hockey World Cup players
21st-century Dutch people